Dumas Boys of GTP (often called as Dumas Boys) is a Ghanaian professional football club based in Tema. They are a currently competing in the Ghana Football Leagues.

In 1976 the team has won the Ghanaian FA Cup

Honours
Ghanaian FA Cup: 1976

References

External links

Football clubs in Ghana
Tema